Weinmeisterstraße  is a Berlin U-Bahn station located on the .

It was built in 1930 by Alexander Grenander and shortly closed during World War II.

During the Berlin Wall (from 1961) the station was closed by the East German government, later on top of the entrances apartments were built. When it was reopened on 1 July 1990, there were some difficulties to open them again, but so far minor cleanup is needed.

References

U8 (Berlin U-Bahn) stations
Buildings and structures in Mitte
Railway stations in Germany opened in 1930